John Patrick Metcalfe (3 February 1912 – 16 January 1994) was an Australian athlete who competed in high jump, long jump and javelin events, though he is best remembered as a triple jumper.

He was educated at Sydney Boys High School and competed for Sydney University Athletics Club.

At the 1934 Empire Games, Metcalfe won the triple jump and took a bronze medal in the long jump. In the high jump event he finished fourth. Competing in Sydney on 14 December 1935, Metcalfe set a new world record in the triple jump, leaping 15.78 metres.

In 1936, Metcalfe won the bronze medal in the men's triple jump at the Olympic Games held in Berlin, Germany.  The winner Naoto Tajima of Japan broke the Australian's world record during the competition. It was later reported that Metcalfe, who was self-coached, assisted the Japanese athletes during the competition and that German officials had complained about this. Metcalfe also participated in the high jump competition and finished twelfth.

Metcalfe's bronze was the only medal won by the entire Australian team at this Olympic Games. At his final international competition – the 1938 British Empire Games in his home-town of Sydney – Metcalfe defended his triple jump gold medal and also took bronze in the javelin. In the long jump event he finished fifth and in the high jump competition he finished seventh.

References

1912 births
1994 deaths
Australian male triple jumpers
Australian male long jumpers
Australian male high jumpers
Australian male javelin throwers
Athletes (track and field) at the 1936 Summer Olympics
Olympic athletes of Australia
Olympic bronze medalists for Australia
Athletes (track and field) at the 1934 British Empire Games
Athletes (track and field) at the 1938 British Empire Games
Commonwealth Games gold medallists for Australia
Commonwealth Games bronze medallists for Australia
World record setters in athletics (track and field)
People educated at Sydney Boys High School
Commonwealth Games medallists in athletics
Medalists at the 1936 Summer Olympics
Olympic bronze medalists in athletics (track and field)
Athletes from Sydney
Sport Australia Hall of Fame inductees
Medallists at the 1934 British Empire Games
Medallists at the 1938 British Empire Games